"Rabbi ben Ezra" is a poem by Robert Browning about the famous Rabbi Abraham ibn Ezra (10921167), one of the great Jewish poets and scholars of the 12th century. He wrote on grammar, astronomy, the astrolabe, and other topics.

Analysis 
The poem begins:

It is not a biography of Abraham ibn Ezra; like all of Browning's historical poems, it is a free interpretation of the idea that ibn Ezra's life and work suggests to Browning. At the center of the poem is a theistic paradox that good might lie in the inevitability of its absence:

History 
The poem was published in Browning's Dramatis Personae in 1864.

References

See also 
 Pebble in the Sky, a science fiction novel by Isaac Asimov that mentions the poem
 "Grow Old with Me", a song by John Lennon, based in part on Browning's poem

Poetry by Robert Browning
1864 poems
British poems